Mariana Cox Méndez (also, Mariana Cox-Stuven; pseudonyms, Shade and Oliver Brand; 1871 – September 8, 1914) was a Chilean writer, feminist, essayist and novelist. In addition to novels and short stories, she wrote pieces in the newspaper El Mercurio, La Union, and La Nación. 

Cox was born in Punta Arenas. She was condemned and criticized by Chilean society because she wrote for the media. Her work can be framed within the so-called feminismo aristocrático, which includes her contemporaries such as Inés Echeverría Bello, María Mercedes Vial, Teresa Wilms Montt, María Luisa Fernández de García Huidobro, and Ximena Morla Lynch. Her second marriage was to Juan Stuven González. She had a son, Ivan. She died in Paris.

Selected works
Un remordimiento: (recuerdos de juventud), 1909
La vida íntima de Marie Goetz, 1909

References

1871 births
1914 deaths
Chilean essayists
Chilean women essayists
Chilean women novelists
People from Punta Arenas
Chilean people of English descent
20th-century Chilean women writers
20th-century Chilean novelists
Chilean feminist writers